Heimdal Glacier is a glacier in southeastern Greenland. It flows into the head of the Timmiarmiut Fjord system of the King Frederick VI Coast, northwest of the island of Timmiarmiit. Its name derives from Heimdallr, a deity of Norse mythology.

See also
List of glaciers in Greenland

References

External links

 NASA: Seasonal Glacier Velocity on the Heimdal Glacier with a pause
 Heimdal Glacier

Glaciers of Greenland